Spondylomoraceae is a family of algae in the order Chlamydomonadales.

References

External links

Chlorophyceae families
Chlamydomonadales